Bobby David Garrad (born 18 January 1960 in Chelmsford, Essex) is a former speedway rider in the United Kingdom who  spent most of his career with Rye House Rockets in the National League. 

Garrad was considered to be one of the best prospects in British speedway in his early days at Rye House after finishing third in the British Under 21 Championship in 1978. He also finished third in the National League Riders Championship in 1982. However he never quite adjusted to the higher level of speedway in the British League.

References

1960 births
Living people
British speedway riders
English motorcycle racers
Sportspeople from Chelmsford
Rye House Rockets riders
King's Lynn Stars riders
Leicester Lions riders
Poole Pirates riders
Hackney Hawks riders